Grecia (hatched ) is a chestnut-mandibled toucan known as the first toucan to receive a prosthetic 3D-printed beak.

Early life and injuries

Grecia was born in the wild in or around Grecia, one of the cantons of Costa Rica, in approximately March 2014. The toucan was beaten by youths, and its top beak broke off. Government officials transported the bird to the animal rescue center Rescate Wildlife Rescue Center (formerly Rescate Animal Zoo Ave), west of the city of Alajuela. A few 3D printing companies joined efforts to create a prosthetic beak which was successfully attached to Grecia. The bird received its name from the town of Grecia where it was picked up by city officials.  Grecia passed away in January 2022, per Zoo Ave employees.

See also 
 Victoria (goose)
 List of individual birds

References 

Individual birds
2014 animal births
Animal cruelty incidents
3D printed objects
Prosthetics